Operation Mastiff was an operation conducted by the U.S. 1st Infantry Division in the Dầu Tiếng District, lasting from 21 to 25 February 1966.

Prelude
U.S. intelligence reports indicated that the People's Army of Vietnam (PAVN) 9th Division planned to attack the Army of the Republic of Vietnam (ARVN) 8th Regiment, 5th Infantry Division in the Dầu Tiếng District and was massing its forces in the Boi Loi Woods 12 km south of Dầu Tiếng. U.S. commander General William Westmoreland ordered MGen Jonathan O. Seaman to launch a spoiling attack on the PAVN.

Concerned about possible leaks by the ARVN III Corps staff, MGen Seaman shared a false plan indicating that the target was the Michelin Rubber Plantation east of Dầu Tiếng and B-52 strikes were conducted in that area to lend it credibility. It was hoped that this would cause the PAVN to move their forces to the west bank of the Saigon River where the real operation would take place. After this ruse had been in place for a week the real operation commenced.

Operation
On the morning of 21 February 142 helicopters began lifting the 2nd and 3rd Brigades of the 1st Infantry Division to establish a cordon around a 100 square kilometer area around the west bank of the Saigon River. The units then moved in from the north and south discovering abandoned base areas, hospitals and supplies but few PAVN soldiers.

Aftermath
Operation Mastiff officially concluded on 25 February, the US claiming PAVN/VC losses were 61 killed (40 in a single airstrike), U.S. losses were 17 killed. The operation was a major disappointment for the U.S. command as the PAVN 9th Division was not engaged and the PAVN had again demonstrated their ability to choose when and where it would stand and fight.

References

Conflicts in 1966
1966 in Vietnam
Battles involving the United States
Battles involving Vietnam
Battles and operations of the Vietnam War in 1966
History of Bình Dương province